Villa  is one of seven parishes (administrative divisions) in the Corvera de Asturias municipality, within the province and autonomous community of Asturias, in northern Spain. 

The population is 386 (INE 2011).

Villages
Barriero
Capiello
El Pontón
El Suco
El Truébano
El Vallín
Fabar
La Laguna
Llamera
La Tabla
Las Huertas
Lloreda
Tras la Iglesia
Villa

Parishes in Corvera de Asturias